Olga Mikhailovna Chernyavskaya, née Davydova, formerly Burova (born 17 September 1963) is a Russian discus thrower. As Olga Burova, she won the gold medal at the 1993 World Championships. She also won European Championships silver in 1990, World Championship bronze in 1995, and is a three-time Olympian.

Career
Born in Irbit, she finished fifth at the 1989 World Cup competing as Olga Davydova for the Soviet Union, before going on to win the gold medal at the 1993 World Championships in Stuttgart competing as Olga Burova for Russia. Her best Olympic performance is 5th place in 1992. She also participated in the Olympics in 1996 and 2004. Her personal best is 68.38m, achieved in 1992.

Still throwing, Chernyavskaya beat the official Masters W50 discus world record while winning the 2015 World Masters Athletics Championships in Lyon, France.

International competitions

See also
List of World Athletics Championships medalists (women)
List of European Athletics Championships medalists (women)
Discus throw at the World Championships in Athletics

References

1963 births
Living people
People from Irbit
Sportspeople from Sverdlovsk Oblast
Soviet female discus throwers
Russian female discus throwers
Olympic athletes of Russia
Olympic athletes of the Unified Team
Athletes (track and field) at the 1992 Summer Olympics
Athletes (track and field) at the 1996 Summer Olympics
Athletes (track and field) at the 2004 Summer Olympics
Goodwill Games medalists in athletics
Competitors at the 1994 Goodwill Games
World Athletics Championships athletes for Russia
World Athletics Championships medalists
World Athletics Championships winners
European Athletics Championships medalists